Ben Armine (705 m) is a remote hill in Sutherland in the far north of Scotland. It lies in inland, north of the village of Lairg.

The best known summit of a range of hills lying southeast of Ben Klibreck, its southern neighbour Creag Mhor is slightly higher.

References

Marilyns of Scotland
Grahams
Mountains and hills of the Northwest Highlands